Keep Me in Mind may refer to:
Keep Me in Mind (novel), a 2005 game-novel based on Buffy the Vampire Slayer
Keep Me in Mind (Miriam Makeba album), 1970
Keep Me in Mind (Lynn Anderson album), 1973
"Keep Me in Mind" (Lynn Anderson song), 1973
"Keep Me in Mind" (Mike Spiteri song), 1995
"Keep Me in Mind", a 2008 song by Little Joy
"Keep Me in Mind" (Zac Brown Band song), 2011
"Keep Me in Mind", a song by Boy George from the album Sold
"Keep Me in Mind", a song by Mack Vickery recorded by Jerry Lee Lewis on Rock & Roll Time 2014